William D. Brown (1813 – February 3, 1868) was the first pioneer to envision building a city where Omaha, Nebraska sits today. Many historians attribute Brown to be the founder of Omaha, although this has been disputed since the late nineteenth century. Alfred D. Jones, the first postmaster of Omaha, laid strong claims to the title himself, suggesting that he told Brown about the potential for a town. Brown was also a member of the Second Territorial Legislature for the Nebraska Territory.

About
Brown lived in Mount Pleasant, Iowa where he was the sheriff of Henry County starting in January, 1837. After leaving for the California Gold Rush in 1850, he stopped in Council Bluffs after seeing that there was an opportunity to earn money ferrying settlers across the Missouri River. After obtaining a charter from the Pottawatomie County Commissioners, Brown called his enterprise the Lone Tree Ferry after the single tree which marked his landing on the Nebraska Territory side of the Missouri River. He later sold the company, which became the Council Bluffs and Nebraska Ferry Company.

Brown's daughter, Mary, married Alfred Sorenson, who became an influential politician in Omaha.

Death
According to a period obituary, Brown's death was caused by a "ruffian" in Council Bluffs, Iowa who mugged him for his money. Brown died shortly after struggling back to his home in Omaha.

Dr. George L. Miller, an early editor of the Omaha Herald, wrote an obituary for Brown. Among other things, he wrote,

See also
 Founding figures of Omaha, Nebraska
 History of Omaha

References

External links
 Photo of Brown

Pioneer history of Omaha, Nebraska
Politicians from Omaha, Nebraska
Businesspeople from Omaha, Nebraska
1813 births
1863 deaths
Members of the Nebraska Territorial Legislature
19th-century American politicians
19th-century American businesspeople